Leptoxis is a genus of freshwater snails with a gill and an operculum, aquatic gastropod mollusks in the family Pleuroceridae.

Species within this genus inhabit rocky fast-flowing parts of unpolluted and unimpounded mid-sized rivers in the American mid South and the southern Midwest.  Species in the subgenus Mudalia inhabit rivers and creeks in the Atlantic drainage.

Species
Species within the genus Leptoxis include. Those that are extinct are marked with a dagger †.
 Leptoxis ampla  (Anthony, 1855) 
 Leptoxis arkansensis (Hinkley, 1915)
 Leptoxis carinata (Bruguière, 1792) 
 Agate rocksnail (Leptoxis clipeata (Smith, 1922))
 Oblong rocksnail (Leptoxis compacta)
 Leptoxis crassa (Haldeman 1841) 
 Leptoxis dilatata (Conrad, 1835) 
 Interrupted rocksnail (Leptoxis foremanii (I. Lea, 1843) )
 Maiden rocksnail (Leptoxis formosa  (I. Lea, 1860) )
 Rotund rocksnail (Leptoxis ligata (Anthony, 1860))
 Lyrate rocksnail (Leptoxis lirata (Smith, 1922))
 Black mudalia (Leptoxis melanoides (Conrad, 1834) )
 Knob mudalia (Leptoxis minor (Hinkley, 1912) )
 Bigmouth rocksnail (Leptoxis occultata (Smith, 1922) )
 Spotted rocksnail (Leptoxis picta)
 Plicate rocksnail (Leptoxis plicata (Hinkley, 1915))
 Mainstream river snail (Leptoxis praerosa (Say, 1821) )
 Coosa rocksnail (Leptoxis showalterii (I. Lea, 1860) )
 Painted rocksnail (Leptoxis taeniata)
 Leptoxis torrefacta
 Leptoxis trilineata (Say, 1829) 
 Leptoxis umbilicata (Wetherby, 1876) 
 Smooth rocksnail (Leptoxis virgata)
 Striped rocksnail (Leptoxis vittata (I. Lea, 1860))

Synonyms:
 Leptoxis anthonyix Anthony's river snail is a synonym for Athearnia anthonyi
 Leptoxis crassa boulder snail is a synonym for Athearnia crassa
 Leptoxis pisum Haldeman, 1848: synonym of  Leptoxis crassa (Haldeman 1841) 
 Leptoxis rapaeformis Haldeman, 1848: synonym of Leptoxis dilatata (Conrad, 1835)

References 

 
Pleuroceridae
Taxa named by Constantine Samuel Rafinesque
Taxonomy articles created by Polbot